Feeney Ridge is a ridge,  long, which is mainly ice free along the crest, paralleling the southeast side of Fergusson Glacier in the Wilson Hills of Antarctica. It was mapped by the United States Geological Survey from surveys and U.S. Navy air photos, 1960–63, and was named by the Advisory Committee on Antarctic Names for Lieutenant Commander Edward J. Feeney, U.S. Navy, Aircraft Commander (LC-130F Hercules) during Operation Deep Freeze 1968.

At its Eastern end is Clarke Bluff.

References 

Ridges of Oates Land